Guyana was a predecessor to the modern-day Co-operative Republic of Guyana and an independent state that existed between 1966 and 1970.

History 
British rule ended on 26 May 1966 when Guyana was given independence from the United Kingdom by the Guyana Independence Act 1966, which transformed British Guiana into an independent sovereign state. Elizabeth II was Queen of Guyana; however, she did not reside in but only visited Guyana once during her reign as Queen of Guyana. The monarch's constitutional roles were mostly delegated to her representative Governor-General of Guyana. Forbes Burnham held office as prime minister (and head of government) of Guyana during this period.

The Republic of Guyana was formed on 23 February 1970 when Guyana became a republic in the Commonwealth.

Following the abolition of the monarchy, former Governor-General Sir Edward Luckhoo provisionally became the de facto acting head of state of Guyana.

Governors-general 
The following governors-general held office:

Sir Richard Luyt (26 May 1966–16 December 1966)
Sir David Rose (16 December 1966–10 November 1969)
Sir Edward Luckhoo (10 November 1969–1 July 1970)

References 

Former Commonwealth realms
Government of Guyana
Guyana and the Commonwealth of Nations
Monarchy
Political history of Guyana
1966 establishments in Guyana
1970 disestablishments in Guyana
States and territories established in 1966
States and territories disestablished in 1970